Short-termism is giving priority to immediate profit, quickly executed projects and short-term results, over long term results and far-seeing action.

Short-termism is attributed to certain cognitive biases.

See also
 Hyperbolic discounting

References 

Business terms
Rhetoric